XFD or xfd may refer to:
 XML Form Definition, a user interface markup language
 .xfd, a filename extension sometimes used for files in the Extensible Forms Description Language
 Douglas XFD, a 1933 naval fighter aircraft prototype
 McDonnell XFD-1 Phantom, a 1945 naval fighter aircraft prototype